Volodymyr Stankevych (born May 17, 1995) is a Ukrainian épée fencer, team silver medalist in the 2017 European Fencing Championships.

Career
Stankevych's first international success was the silver medal at the 2015 Summer Universiade in Gwangju, South Korea. Since the 2016-17 season he was actively involved in international competitions representing Ukraine. He won a silver medal in the team épée event of the 2017 European Fencing Championships in Tbilisi, Georgia.

References

External links
 Profile

1995 births
Living people
Ukrainian male épée fencers
Universiade medalists in fencing
Universiade silver medalists for Ukraine
Medalists at the 2015 Summer Universiade
20th-century Ukrainian people
21st-century Ukrainian people